Mogielnica is a place in Masovian Voivodeship (east-central Poland).

Mogielnica may also refer to:
Mogielnica, Płock County in Masovian Voivodeship (east-central Poland)
Mogielnica, Subcarpathian Voivodeship (south-east Poland)
Mogielnica, Siedlce County in Masovian Voivodeship (east-central Poland)